The year 1791 in science and technology involved some significant events.

Biology
 Jean Baptiste François Pierre Bulliard begins publication of Histoire des champignons de la France, a significant text in mycology.
 Luigi Galvani publishes his discoveries in "animal electricity" (Galvanism).

Chemistry
 Nicolas Leblanc patents the Leblanc process for the production of soda ash (sodium carbonate) from common salt (sodium chloride).
 The element Titanium is discovered included in ilmenite in Cornwall, England, by local amateur geologist Rev. William Gregor.

Mathematics
 American statesmen Thomas Jefferson introduces the highest averages method of voting which also becomes known as the D'Hondt method.

Medicine
 May 7 – Irish surgeon Samuel Croker-King first describes his trepanning device.

Metrology
 March – In France, the National Constituent Assembly accepts the recommendation of its Commission of Weights and Measures that the nation should adopt the metric system.

Physics
 Pierre Prévost shows that all bodies radiate heat, no matter how hot or cold they are.

Technology
 James Rumsey is granted a patent related to fluid power engineering, in England.

Publications
 Sir John Sinclair's Statistical Account of Scotland begins publication, introducing the term Statistics into English.

Awards
 Copley Medal: James Rennell; Jean-André Deluc

Births
 March 20 – John Farey, English mechanical engineer and technical writer (died 1851)
 April 9 – George Peacock, English mathematician (died 1858)
 April 27 – Samuel F. B. Morse, American inventor (died 1872)
 July 13 – Allan Cunningham, English botanist and explorer (died 1839)
 July 27 - Jean-Nicolas Gannal, French pharmacist, chemist, and inventor (died 1852)
 September 4 – Robert Knox, Scottish anatomist (died 1862)
 September 22 – Michael Faraday, English chemist and physicist (died 1867)
 September 23 – Johann Franz Encke, German astronomer (died 1865)
 December 26 – Charles Babbage, English mathematician and inventor of computing machines (died 1871)

Deaths
 July 24 – Ignaz von Born, Hungarian metallurgist (born 1742)
 Date unknown – Maria Petraccini, Italian anatomist and physician (died 1759)

References

 
18th century in science
1790s in science